Browns Brasserie & Bar is a British chain of restaurants, mostly located in the south of England.

Browns was the first hospitality venture established by Jeremy Mogford, who in 1973 invested £10,000 (of which £2,500 was borrowed from his father) in the first Browns Restaurant and Bar in Brighton, East Sussex. He established a chain of seven restaurants, mostly in university towns such as Bristol, Cambridge and Oxford, with an annual turnover of £15 million. In 1996, Mogford sold the Browns chain to Bass Brewery for £35 million.

Mogford was regarded as one of the industry's best and most enlightened employers, which was reflected in a low staff turnover rate. He and his restaurants were used as a case study in a hospitality and entrepreneurship textbook illustrating commitment to employees. In addition, Browns was profiled in a widely used capacity management study by Deterministics Inc. for Cornell University's Cornell Hotel and Restaurant Administration Quarterly journal.

The chain now consists of twenty-six restaurants – in Bath, Birmingham, Bluewater, Brighton, Bristol, Cambridge, Edinburgh, Glasgow, Kingston, Leeds, Liverpool, Manchester, Milton Keynes, Nottingham, Oxford, Reading, Sheffield and Windsor, and eight restaurants in London; Beaconsfield, Butlers Wharf, Covent Garden, Mayfair, Old Jewry, Ruislip, Victoria & West India Quay.

Browns Manchester is in a Grade II* listed building – an Edwardian bank building constructed in 1902 for Parr's Bank by Charles Heathcote). Browns in Bristol is a listed building that has previously been the City Museum and Library and also the University Refectory and Dining Room. Browns on Woodstock Road in Oxford is mentioned in the novel Restless (winner of the Novel Award in the 2006 Costa Book Awards) by William Boyd.

References

External links

British companies established in 1973
Mitchells & Butlers
Restaurant groups in the United Kingdom
Restaurants in Somerset
Restaurants established in 1973
1973 establishments in England